Thomas Zeng Jing-mu (September 3, 1920 – April 2, 2016) was a Chinese Roman Catholic bishop.

Born in China, Zeng Jing-mu was ordained a priest on March 23, 1949. In 1988 he was appointed and on January 13, 1990, was clandestinely consecrated as bishop, and from 1988 to 2012 was a bishop ordinary of the Roman Catholic Diocese of Yujiang.

References

1920 births
2016 deaths
20th-century Roman Catholic bishops in China
21st-century Roman Catholic bishops in China